The canton of Bourg-Achard is an administrative division of the Eure department, northern France. It was created at the French canton reorganisation which came into effect in March 2015. Its seat is in Bourg-Achard.

It consists of the following communes:

Aizier
Barneville-sur-Seine
Bosgouet
Bouquelon
Bouquetot
Bourg-Achard
Bourneville-Sainte-Croix
Caumont
Cauverville-en-Roumois
Étréville
Éturqueraye
Hauville
La Haye-Aubrée
La Haye-de-Routot
Honguemare-Guenouville
Le Landin
Marais-Vernier
Quillebeuf-sur-Seine
Rougemontiers
Routot
Saint-Aubin-sur-Quillebeuf
Sainte-Opportune-la-Mare
Saint-Ouen-de-Thouberville
Saint-Samson-de-la-Roque
Tocqueville
La Trinité-de-Thouberville
Trouville-la-Haule
Valletot
Vieux-Port

References

Cantons of Eure